WR 133 is a visually moderately bright Wolf-Rayet star.  It is a spectroscopic binary system containing a Wolf-Rayet primary and a class O supergiant secondary.  It is in the constellation of Cygnus, lying in the sky at the centre of the triangle formed by β and γ Cygni, near η Cygni.  It is the brightest member of the sparse open cluster NGC 6871.

WR 133 is one of the brightest Wolf Rayet (WR) stars in the northern hemisphere, slightly brighter than WR 140 which also in Cygnus. The WR star is typically identified as the primary, being more massive, more luminous, and dominating the spectrum. However, the supergiant secondary is more massive and visually brighter. The primary star is a WN5 nitrogen-rich WR star and the secondary has a spectral type of O9I. This is the first WN-type WR star to have its mass dynamically determined from orbital motion, although the precision is hampered by the nearly face-on orientation of the orbit.

WR 133 is listed as a Wolf-Rayet variable star and has been given the variable star designation V1676 Cyg in the General Catalogue of Variable Stars.  Its visual magnitude varies between 6.75 and 6.84.

References

Cygnus (constellation)
Wolf–Rayet stars
J20055731+3547181
190918
Spectroscopic binaries
Cygni, V1676
BD+35 3953
099002
O-type supergiants